Ed Weeks set numerous world records for growing large vegetables.  In 1964, he founded Weeks Seed Company.  He resided in Tarboro, North Carolina.

Records
Records set by Weeks:
1970:  118 lb Watermelon
1975: 197 lb Watermelon
1977: 39 lb Cantaloupe
1978: 3.5 inch long Peanut

References

Living people
People from Tarboro, North Carolina
Year of birth missing (living people)